Beyond Hell/Above Heaven is the fourth studio album by Danish rock band Volbeat. The album was released on 10 September 2010 on EMI in Denmark, on Vertigo in the rest of Europe, and on Republic in the United States.

The title refers to the overall theme of the album, continuing the storyline of Guitar Gangsters & Cadillac Blood. This was the first Volbeat album to chart on the Billboard 200, and was certified Gold by the RIAA on 22 March 2016.

Background 
The album, Beyond Hell/Above Heaven was released on 10 September 2010. Michael Poulsen explained the title of the album stating "...it’s a way telling people that we don’t belong or believe in neither heaven nor hell. So if we go beyond hell, we will make heaven look like hell, and if we go above heaven, we will make hell look like heaven. Heaven and hell is something we create in our minds and personal self-created demons come out of that." Featured on the album is previously released track, "A Warrior's Call", which was made for Danish boxer Mikkel Kessler. The track Evelyn contains some death grunts provided by Mark "Barney" Greenway (Napalm Death), which was a whole new element on Volbeat's music, making a groove metal style.

Michael Poulsen has also revealed several of the guest musicians on the album stating "I’m very very proud to have these fine gentlemen with me, since they inspired me a lot for a long time."

The cover and artwork was created by Karsten Sand.

Reception

Critical reception

The AllMusic review by Thom Jurek awarded the album 3.5 stars stating "Any way you slice it, Volbeat, a skillful repository of so many lineage sounds, are their own thing: a band apart who are sophisticated, accessible, and utterly entertaining as songwriters and performers. Nowhere is this more true than on Beyond Hell/Above Heaven.".

Commercial performance
The album debuted at number 142 on the Billboard 200 in the United States. On 22 March 2016, the album was certified gold by the RIAA for shipments of 500,000 units. The album has sold over 1,000,000 copies worldwide.

Track listing

Personnel
Volbeat
 Michael Poulsen – vocals, rhythm guitar
 Anders Kjølholm – bass
 Jon Larsen – drums
 Thomas Bredahl – lead guitar

Guest musicians
 Mark "Barney" Greenway – Napalm Death - vocals on "Evelyn"
 Michael Denner – Mercyful Fate/King Diamond - lead guitar on "7 Shots"
 Miland "Mille" Petrozza – Kreator - vocals on "7 Shots"
 Henrik Hall – Love Shop – harmonica on "Heaven Nor Hell"
 Jakob Øelund – Taggy Tones – slap bass on "16 Dollars"

Charts

Weekly charts

Year-end charts

Decade-end charts

Certifications

See also 
 List of number-one albums of 2010 (Finland)

References

External links 

 
 

2010 albums
Volbeat albums
Vertigo Records albums
Albums produced by Jacob Hansen